Pyroderces apparitella is a species of moth in the family Cosmopterigidae. It is endemic to New Zealand and has been observed in the North Island where it is regarded by some as being not common. The preferred habitat of this species is native forests and residential gardens. Adults are on the wing in December and January and the species is attracted to light.

Taxonomy
This species was first described by Francis Walker in 1864 using a female specimen obtained from D. Bolton in Auckland and named Gelechia apparitella. The holotype specimen is held at the Natural History Museum, London.  In 1889 Edward Meyrick placed this species within the genus Proterocosma. However, in 1928 George Hudson discussed and illustrated the species under the name Pyroderces apparitella. John S. Dugdale affirmed the placement of this species in the genus Pyroderces in 1988. In 2019, in a publication by Alan Emmerson & Robert Hoare, this species was referred to as  Pyroderces (s.l.) apparitella, indicating that the authors had doubt about the placement of this species within that genus.

Description

Walker described the species as follows:

Distribution
This species is endemic to New Zealand. It is found in the North Island. This species was observed in areas near Napier and Hastings in the early 1970s but was regarded as not common. It has also been recorded in North Auckland but only rarely. It has also been observed in Wellington.

Behaviour and biology 

It is on the wing in December and January. This species has been observed via light trapping indicating it is attracted to light. When resting the wings of this species lay close to its body forming a sharp point.

Habitat and host species 
This species inhabits native forests and residential gardens.

References

Moths described in 1864
Cosmopterigidae
Moths of New Zealand
Endemic fauna of New Zealand
Taxa named by Francis Walker (entomologist)
Endemic moths of New Zealand